The General Frank M. Coxe was a steam ferry which was built for the United States Army to provide transportation services among several military facilities that ring California's San Francisco Bay. The Army port facilities, including the vessels, throughout the bay were under the command of the San Francisco Port of Embarkation from its establishment in May 1932 through World War II and the Korean War.

The  ship's keel was laid on July 16, 1921, launched March 3, 1922, and delivered December 1, 1922, to the War Department by Charles Ward Engineering Works. Coxe and sister-ship  were designed and built shortly after World War I to ferry army personnel to island bases in strategic harbors, in answer to the increasing military importance of the Pacific ports.

Prior to the availability of the current system of bridges and highways in San Francisco Bay, mobility on the water was critical. It is estimated that the General Frank M. Coxe carried six million passengers during her military service.

Design and construction
The Coxe was not a navy ship; it was among the thousands of vessels owned and operated by the US Army for specific logistical purposes.  It was designed by the New York firm of Cox & Stevens, who were renowned Naval Architects specializing in yachts and small commercial and military craft.  The Coxe was built in 1922, along with the General John McE. Hyde (built 1921), to Cox & Stevens design  #244 by Charles Ward Engineering Works of Charleston, West Virginia, located on the Kanawha River, a firm which specialized in shallow draft vessels such as ferries, riverboats, and tugs. (The Hyde was sunk by Japanese artillery at Corregidor on April 15, 1942, during World War II.)

History

Military use
The Coxe was an active military vessel on San Francisco Bay from the 1922 to 1947, being decommissioned and sold for surplus in 1947 after the end of World War II.

Prior to the building of the Golden Gate and Bay bridges in the mid-1930s, ground transportation in the Bay Area was hampered by the Bay and the rivers which bisected the region from San Jose to the Sacramento River Delta.  However, this region was heavily populated by the Army personnel who garrisoned and maintained the ring of fortresses and ancillary facilities from Fort Point and Fort Cronkite at the mouth of the Bay, to the Benicia Arsenal at the mouth of the Delta.  There were two island fortresses: Fort McDowell (Angel Island) and Alcatraz, with each of these becoming special purpose facilities by the time of the Coxe.

By the 1920s, Angel Island and Alcatraz were considered obsolete as artillery positions, with their purposes supplanted by larger coastal guns and extensive electronic mines as the primary coastal defenses. As aircraft developed, these also became irrelevant.  Angel Island developed as a processing center for inductees and recruits, and Alcatraz developed into a maximum security military prison.   The Coxe provided a regular service between Fort Mason, on the north coast of the San Francisco peninsula, and Fort McDowell on Angel Island, with periodic stops at Alcatraz.  The Alcatraz service continued after the Army relinquished control to the Federal Prison Bureau in the mid-1930s.

Alcatraz prison break

Alcatraz Prison almost lost one of its boarders when John K. Giles, aged 50, a mail robber and four-time convict, stole an army uniform from the prison laundry and jumped aboard the Coxe just before she departed for Angel Island.  Although a count of both the soldiers on the Coxe and the prisoners working on the docks alerted the authorities to an escape, an error in communication and forged documents allowed Giles to land at Fort McDowell.  However, a discrepancy in his uniform brought him to the attention of an officer, who then recognized his forged documents and arrested him not knowing of the prison break.  Giles was returned to Alcatraz to serve-out his sentence.  There was some controversy over whether this constituted a successful escape and a recapture, or a foiled plan. Officially, Alcatraz retained its perfect record as "escape proof" until it closed in the mid-1960s, since it was assumed that all other missing prisoners had drowned.

World War II
Fort McDowell, after 1932 a facility of the San Francisco Port of Embarkation, became a critical processing center of the for US troops heading to the Pacific theater of battle with U.S. entry into World War II. The early troop processing was substantially divided between Fort McDowell and Fort Mason, and despite the new bridges and highways, ships and ferries were the only connection between the locations. During World War II, the Coxe made as many as eight scheduled trips per day between Fort McDowell and Fort Mason. After activation in May 1942 of Camp Stoneman, the largest troop staging area on the west coast, Fort McDowell continued as a center for processing unassigned enlisted personnel and prisoner of war camp. After satisfying the exigencies of the war, Fort McDowell was eventually phased-out after World War II, and was closed as a processing center prior to the Korean War. By 1947 the Coxe was obsolete and was decommissioned.

Post military use

Tour ferry
After her military service the Coxe was bought by the Golden Gate Scenic Steamship Line, which now operate the Red & White Fleet of ferry and tour boats on San Francisco Bay.  The Coxe operated as the SS Frank M. Coxe as a local cruise ship and tour ferry until the 1950s.

Restaurant

After retiring as an active vessel, the Coxe was converted to a floating restaurant called the Showboat in Stockton, California.  The restaurant went through several leases and was operated under several names in various locations.  At one point it was a dance club catering to the “under 21” patrons.  In the 1960s and 1970s it was berthed at Jack London Square in Oakland, California, and then moved to Burlingame, California and operated as the Pattaya Princess, a Thai restaurant, in the 1970s and 1980s, closing in 1990.

Current use
From the closing of the Pattaya Princess until 2006, the General Frank M. Coxe was a vacant hulk, until local restaurateurs bought the ship from Mr. Robert Sherman, where it remained berthed in San Francisco Bay in Burlingame, California, just south of San Francisco International Airport.

The new owners obtained an extended lease from the City of Burlingame and renovated the vessel.  The name of the vessel was changed from the General Frank M. Coxe to The Sherman in honor of the previous owner, and then was operated as a restaurant of that name.

In 2008, the owner had taken out a loan to repair her, but the loan defaulted and The Sherman went into foreclosure. The State Lands Commission, who owns the land The Sherman rested upon, asked for the vessel to be moved. On Sunday, June 15, 2014, The Sherman/Coxe was removed from her location in Burlingame and towed to the Stockton Marina.

The Sherman was towed to Mare Island Naval Shipyard in Vallejo, CA and broken up for scrap. The work was completed on January 10, 2020.

References
Notes

Bibliography

National Park Service - Maritime Heritage Program Historic Ships to Visit - Listed by Name, specifications of the Coxe
 Mystic Seaport Museum, Inc. Coll. 34, Daniel S. Gregory Ships Plans Library
General Frank M. Coxe (vessel), California History Magazine Volume 66, page 37 published by California Historical Society
 U.S. Army ships and Watercraft of World War II by David H. Grover; Published: Annapolis, Md. by the Naval Institute Press, 1987.
Angel Island, Branwell Fanning and William Wong, Arcadia Publishing, 2006 
West Virginia State Archives, Description of Charles Ward Engineering.
  REPORT OF THE WARDEN, UNITED STATES PENITENTIARY ALCATRAZ ISLAND, CALIFORNIA, Excerpted from Federal Offenders: 1934-35
BAY TRAIL ADVENTURE, Stalking the wild Peninsula San Francisco Chronicle, Carl T. Hall, Photos by Lance Iversen of The Chronicle Staff, Tuesday, July 22, 2003
 Ahoy, chow beckons, Oakland Tribune, April 7, 2005 (retrieved by paid online subscription 4-5-08)
Steamboat reopens as restaurant Oakland Tribune,  Dec 4, 2007  by Aaron Kinney
Three-Alarm Fire Damages Boat Oakland Tribune,  Feb 5, 2006  by Christine Morente
Site Description Lease extension documented by county records 2/9/06
Association of Bay Area Governments Description of site and condition prior to purchase
Agenda of the San Francisco Port commission, 12/11/02   Golden Gate Scenic Steamship Corporation operates the Red & White Fleet
  Alcatraz Escapes San Francisco Genealogy, Discussion of 1945 prison break on SS Coxe.
The Eater Post-Plywood Report Boat Edition: The Sherman Sets Sail in Burlingame Monday, December 3, 2007
Golden Gate Scenic Steamship Line brochure published 1949
Corregidor.org Mention of the sister ship Hyde used at Corrgeidor.
The Moore Report table of organization & equipment including the sister ship Hyde
"MOBILE" Battery “M” 60th coast artillery (a.a.) by Lt. Col. E. L. BARR, describes the sinking of the Hyde.
Burlingame Historical Society physical archives and displays as interpreted by curator Martha May
Historic ship back in Stockton, Jul. 12, 2014, Tony Sauro, RecordNet.com 

1922 ships
Transport ships of the United States Army
Harbor vessels of the United States
Military facilities in the San Francisco Bay Area
Ferries of California
History of the San Francisco Bay Area
Restaurants in the San Francisco Bay Area
Defunct restaurants in the San Francisco Bay Area
Floating restaurants
Ships built in Charleston, West Virginia